The brown mastiff bat (Promops nasutus), is a bat species found in Venezuela, Trinidad, Guyana, Suriname, Brazil, Ecuador, Peru, Bolivia, Paraguay, and northern Argentina.

References

Promops
Mammals described in 1823
Taxa named by Johann Baptist von Spix
Bats of South America